Jennifer Terran is an American singer-songwriter and pianist.

Career
Terran plays the piano and sings on her records, often leading to her being compared to Tori Amos. She is also, however, a hip hop dance instructor, as well as a producer, having established her own music label, Grizelda Records, on which she has produced five solo albums: Cruel, Rabbit, The Musician, Live from Painted Cave and Full Moon in 3. In October 2012 she released her album Born from the Womb of Silence.

Acclaim
In 2002 the Sunday Times selected her album The Musician as its second best album of the year.

In December 2007, Terran's recording of "Que Sera Sera" featured in a commercial for Dell's XPS computer, accompanied by exploding monitors and wrecking balls.

Personal life
Her childhood spent in Los Angeles, California was infused with music and musical influences.  Her father, trumpeter Tony Terran, was a successful session musician in Los Angeles.

Discography

References

External links
Jennifer Terran official site

Living people
American women singer-songwriters
American women pop singers
American pop pianists
Singers from Los Angeles
21st-century American women pianists
21st-century American pianists
Year of birth missing (living people)
Singer-songwriters from California